Jawaharnagar is a town and an industrial notified area in Vadodara district in the Indian state of Gujarat.

Demographics
 India census, Jawaharnagar  had a population of 4666. Males constitute 51% of the population and females 49%. Jawaharnagar  has an average literacy rate of 79%, higher than the national average of 59.5%: male literacy is 83%, and female literacy is 75%. In Jawaharnagar 14% of the population is under 6 years of age.

References

Cities and towns in Vadodara district